Basnahira North cricket team represents northern region of Western Province, Sri Lanka in first-class cricket tournaments. Basnahira North is based in Colombo. The team competes in two Sri Lankan domestic cricket competitions. The first-class Inter-Provincial tournament and the Twenty20 competition known as the Inter-Provincial Twenty20. The team also participated in, now defunct, the Inter-Provincial Limited Overs Tournament in 2007–08. From 2009 onwards champions of the Inter-Provincial Twenty20 tournament will be eligible to represent Sri Lanka in Twenty20 Champions League. But Basnahira North did not win the title in this year. The team draws cricketers from first-class club competition Premier Limited Overs Tournament. The top 75 players of the tournament selected for the Inter-Provincial tournament.

Basnahira North's home ground is R. Premadasa Stadium, which is situated in northern part of city of Colombo. E-wis, a Sri Lankan IT company is the team's sponsor. Many cricketers who had represented leading schools in Colombo ended up playing for the Western province. Current captain of the side, Chaminda Vaas is a player who studied at the St. Joseph's College, Colombo.

2008/09 season
Basnhira North won the 2008–09 Inter-Provincial tournament beating Wayamba by 10 wickets in the finals. Angelo Mathews scored 152 runs in the finals and finished as the highest scorer in the tournament. Earlier in the tournament Mathews also scored a career best 270 against Kandurata. In 2009 Inter-Provincial Twenty20 tournament they managed to beat only the Schools invitational XI. The team did not qualify for the semi-finals.

Name and participation
From the early years of the Inter-Provincial tournament to 2004–05 season teams used English names. But from 2007 to 2008 onwards the teams were named in Sinhalese. From its inception of the tournament Western Province presented more than one team to the tournament except for 2003–04	and 2004–05 seasons. Since then Western province teams became known as Basnahira North and Basnahira South. Basnahira is Sinhalese for West. Number of teams representing Western province varied from season to season and their names also. Teams represented Western Province for the each tournament given below.

Notable players
The following is a list of players who have represented both Basnahira North and Sri Lanka.

Current squad
The squad for the 2008–09 season as of 22 March 2009.

||  || Chaminda Vaas (Captain) ||  35 ||  All-rounder ||  LHB ||  LFM
|-
||  || Thilina Kandamby ||  26 ||  Batsman ||  LHB ||  LS
|-
||  || Amal Athulathmudali ||  22 ||  Batsman ||  LHB ||  RFM
|-
||  || Ian Daniel ||  27 ||  Batsman ||  RHB ||  RM
|-
||  || Daminda Darshanpriya ||  25 ||  Bowler ||  RHB ||  RMF
|-
||  || Shanuka Dissanayake ||  31 ||  All-rounder ||  RHB ||  LO
|-
||  || Nuwan Pradeep ||  22 ||  Bowler ||  RHB ||  RFM
|-
||  || Saliya Saman ||  23 ||  All-rounder ||  RHB ||  RFM
|-
||  || Nuwan Kulasekara ||  26 ||  Bowler ||  RHB ||  RFM
|-
||  || Angelo Mathews ||  21 ||  All-rounder ||  RHB ||  RFM
|-
||  || Dhanuka Pathirana ||  26 ||  Batsman ||  RHB ||  OS
|-
||  || Bhathiya Perera ||  31 ||  All-rounder ||  RHB ||  LS
|-
||  || Muthumudalige Pushpakumara ||  27 ||  All-rounder ||  LHB ||  OS
|-
||  || Kaushal Silva ||  22 ||  Wicket keeper ||  RHB ||  
|-
||  || Gayan Wijekoon ||  32 ||  All-rounder ||  LHB ||  RM
|-
|}
|}

Honours

Inter-Provincial Tournament: 1
 2008/09

Inter-Provincial Limited Overs Tournament: 

Inter-Provincial Twenty20:

References

Former senior cricket clubs of Sri Lanka